David Jiříček (born 28 November 2003) is a Czech professional ice hockey defenseman for the Cleveland Monsters of the American Hockey League (AHL) as a prospect to the Columbus Blue Jackets of the National Hockey League (NHL). He was drafted sixth overall by the Blue Jackets in the 2022 NHL Entry Draft.

Competing internationally as part of Team Czechia, he won a bronze medal at the 2022 IIHF World Championship.

Playing career

Extraliga
Jiříček made his professional debut for HC Škoda Plzeň during the 2019–20 season where he appeared in four games. During the 2020–21 season, in his first full season with Plzeň, he recorded three goals and six assists in 34 games. Following his rookie season, he was named Czech Extraliga Rookie of the Year.

He was drafted 54th overall by the Spokane Chiefs in the 2020 CHL Import Draft.

Jiříček played only 29 games in the 2021–22 season after a knee injury suffered at the 2022 World Junior Ice Hockey Championships.

Columbus Blue Jackets
In the leadup to the 2022 NHL Entry Draft, Jiříček was considered a top prospect, and for much of the year there was debate as to whether he or Slovak Šimon Nemec would be the first defenceman taken. Following Jiříček's injury at the World Junior Championships, Nemec became favoured to go first. Ultimately, Nemec was taken second overall by the New Jersey Devils, while Jiříček was drafted sixth overall by the Columbus Blue Jackets.

International play

Jiříček represented the Czech Republic at the 2021 World Junior Ice Hockey Championships, where he recorded one assist in four games. He rejoined the national junior team at the 2022 World Junior Ice Hockey Championships the following year. However, he suffered an injury in his first game after a knee-on-knee collision with Team Canada forward Will Cuylle, and was forced to withdraw from the tournament. Jiříček returned to the ice for the 2022 IIHF World Championship, where he played five games in his debut with the senior national team, before a planned withdrawal to avoid overtaxing his knee. He shared in the team's bronze medal win, the first World medal for the Czech Republic in ten years.

Career statistics

Regular season and playoffs

International

References

External links
 

2003 births
Living people
Cleveland Monsters players
Columbus Blue Jackets draft picks
Columbus Blue Jackets players
Czech ice hockey defencemen
HC Plzeň players
People from Klatovy
National Hockey League first-round draft picks
Sportspeople from the Plzeň Region
Czech expatriate ice hockey players in the United States